The General Debate of the sixty-eighth session of the United Nations General Assembly commenced on 24 September 2013 and ended on 4 October 2013. Leaders from a number of member states addressed the UNGA. There was controversy in this session. Controversially, Libya broke with protocol.

Organisation and subjects
The order of speakers is given first to member states, then observer states and supranational bodies. Any other observers entities will have a chance to speak at the end of the debate, if they so choose. Speakers will be put on the list in the order of their request, with special consideration for ministers and other government officials of similar or higher rank. According to the rules in place for the General Debate, the statements should be in of the United Nations official languages of Arabic, Chinese, English, French, Russian or Spanish, and will be translated by the United Nations translators. Each speaker is requested to provide 20 advance copies of their statements to the conference officers to facilitate translation and to be presented at the podium. Though there is no time limit for speeches, a voluntary guideline of 15 minutes is requested.

In addition to commenting on issues of individual national and wider international relevance, the President of the General Assembly John William Ashe chose the theme: "The Post-2015 Development Agenda: Setting the Stage!." This means he calls on member states and other stakeholders "to promote dialogue, reflection and commitment to the formulation of an effective new agenda to overcome poverty and insecurity and ensure sustainable development."

The topics of the General Debate included the Syrian civil war and Iran and nuclear weapons. Other issues included the annual debate on United Nations reform, climate change (particularly amongst the Small Island Developing States), Ashe's chosen subject and the Arms Trade Treaty.

Speaking schedule
Saudi Arabia canceled its speech citing "international double standards" on the Middle East as the reason.

The rest of the speaking schedule in the General Assembly Chamber is as follows:

24 September
Morning schedule
 – Secretary-General Ban Ki-moon 
 – 68th Session of the United Nations General Assembly – President John William Ashe
 – President Dilma Rousseff
 – President Barack Obama
 – President Abdullah Gül
 – President Goodluck Jonathan
 – President Sebastián Piñera Echeñique
 – President Rossen Plevneliev
 – President Armando Emílio Guebuza
 – President François Hollande
 – King Abdullah II
 – President Ivan Gašparovič
 – President Juan Manuel Santos Calderón
 – Emir Tamim bin Hamad Al Thani
 – Prince Albert II
 – President Jacob Zuma
 – President Viktor Yanukovych
 – President Mahinda Rajapaksa

Afternoon schedule
 – President Laura Chinchilla Miranda
 – President Heinz Fischer
 – President Horacio Manuel Cartes Jara
 – President Andris Bērziņš
 – President Ellen Johnson-Sirleaf
 – President Hassan Rouhani 
 – President Ali Bongo Ondimba
 – President Željko Komšić
 – President Michel Sleiman
 – President Ueli Maurer
 – President José Mujica
 –President  Yoweri Kaguta Museveni
 – President Cristina Fernández
 – President Joyce Hilda Mtila Banda
 – President Michael Chilufya Sata
 – Prime Minister Fredrik Reinfeldt

25 September
Morning schedule
 – President Toomas Hendrik Ilves
 – President Ricardo Martinelli
 – President Alassane Ouattara
 – President Ollanta Humala Tasso
 – President Taur Matan Ruak
 – President Macky Sall
 – President Joseph Kabila Kabange
 – President Macky Sall (Scheduled)
 – President Andry Nirina Rajoelina
 – President Paul Kagame (Scheduled)
 – President Blaise Compaoré
 – Prime Minister Hailemariam Desalegn
 – Prime Minister Winston Baldwin Spencer
 – Prime Minister Commodore Josaia V. Bainimarama
 – President Herman Van Rompuy
 – Prime Minister Sheikh Jaber Al-Mubarak Al-Hamad Al-Sabah 
 – Prime Minister Enrico Letta

Afternoon schedule
 – President Tomislav Nikolić
 – President Idriss Deby Itno
 – President Paul Kagame
 – President Anote Tong
 – President Bronislaw Komorowski
 – King Mswati III
 – President Mikheil Saakashvili
 – President Carlos Mauricio Funes Cartagena (Scheduled)
 – President Emanuel Mori
 – President Carlos Mauricio Funes Cartagena
 – President Tommy Remengesau Jr.
 – President Ikililou Dhoinine
 – President Evo Morales Ayma0
 – Prime Minister Mariano Rajoy Brey (Scheduled)
 – President Ali Zeidan
 – Prime Minister Kamla Persad-Bissessar
 – Prime Minister Mariano Rajoy Brey
 – Prime Minister Oqil Oqilov
 – Foreign Minister Pierre Moukoko Mbonjo
 – Foreign Minister Espen Barth Eide
 – Foreign Minister Nassirou Bako Arifari (Scheduled)

26 September
Morning schedule
 - President Donald Rabindranauth Ramotar
 - President Hifikepunye Pohamba
 - President Nicos Anastasiades 
 - President John Dramani Mahama
 - President Elbegdorj Tsakhia
 - President Borut Pahor
 - President Mohamed Moncef Marzouki 
 - President Dalia Grybauskaitė 
 - President Baron Divavesi Waqa 
 - President Robert Mugabe 
 - President Otto Fernando Pérez Molina 
 - President Mahmoud Abbas 
 - Prime Minister Joseph Muscat 
 - Prime Minister Shinzo Abe

Afternoon schedule
 - President Ivo Josipović 
 - President Omar al-Bashir (Scheduled)
 - President Christopher Loeak 
 - President Teodoro Obiang Nguema Mbasogo 
 - President Hassan Sheikh Mohamud 
 - President Michel Djotodia 
 - Interim President Manuel Serifo Nhamadjo 
 - Vice President James Wani Igga 
 - Prime Minister John Key (Scheduled)
 - Prime Minister Iurie Leancă 
 - Prime Minister Thomas Motsoahae Thabane 
 - Prime Minister Elio Di Rupo
 - Prime Minister Laurent Salvador Lamothe 
 - Prime Minister John Key 
 - Foreign Minister Bruno Rodriguez Parrilla 
 - Foreign Minister Ramtane Lamamra 
 - Foreign Minister Samura Kamara 
 - Foreign Minister Laurent Kavakure 
 - Foreign Minister José Antonio Meade Kuribreña 
 - Foreign Minister Nassirou Bako Arifari

27 September
Morning schedule
 - President Yahya Jammeh
 - King Tupou VI
 - President Ibrahim Boubacar Keïta
 - Vice President Khudheir Mussa Al-khuzaie
 - Vice President Manuel Domingos Vicente
 - Vice President María Antonieta de Bográn
 - Vice President Danny Faure
 - Prime Minister Muhammad Nawaz Sharif
 - Prime Minister Denzil Douglas
 - Deputy Prime Minister Nicholas Clegg
 - Foreign Minister Sergey Lavrov
 - Foreign Minister Yun Byung-se
 - Foreign Minister Wang Yi
 - Foreign Minister Julie Bishop (Scheduled)
 - Foreign Minister Abdulaziz Kamilov
 - Foreign Minister Julie Bishop
 - Foreign Minister Franciscus Cornelis Gerardus Maria Timmerans
 - Foreign Minister Basile Ikouebe

Afternoon schedule
 - President Jakaya Mrisho Kikwete
 - Prime Minister Ralph Gonsalves
 - Prime Minister Tuilaepa Sailele Malielegaoi
 - President Sheikh Hasina
 - Prime Minister Nikola Gruevski
 - Prime Minister Pasquale Valentini
 - Prime Minister Milo Đukanović
 - Prime Minister Nguyen Tan Dung
 - Prime Minister Jiří Rusnok
 - Deputy Prime Minister Jean Asselborn
 - Foreign Minister Evangelos Venzelos
 - Deputy Prime Minister Mohamed Bazoum
 - Foreign Minister Ali Ahmed Karti
 - Foreign Minister Erlan A. Idrissov
 - Foreign Minister Marty Natalegawa
 - Foreign Minister Zalmai Rassoul
 - Foreign Minister Erkki Tuomioja
 - Foreign Minister Elías J. Jaua Milano

Right of reply
Member states have the option to reply to comments on the day (or even to the days prior), but are limited to 10 minutes for the first response and five minutes for the second response. All speeches are made from the floor, as opposed to the podium for the General Debate.

North Korea responded by saying South Korea had misleading remarks in regard to nuclear weapons while it was under the nuclear umbrella of the U.S. and thus allowed nuclear weapons into the Korean peninsula and also thus undermined peace in the peninsula. It even denied international law to get verification by IAEA. South Korea then launched a satellite just after that of North Korea and, as such, the U.S. lied it was not an issue at the UNSC. This was a double standard. UNSC history suggests a satellite as a threat to peace and security and by mandate the UNSC does not note a peaceful satellite launch, the UNSC was silent. Parallel to North Korea policy, provocation cannot be a bargaining chip. Amongst points made was that of family reunification, yet during dialogue South Korea opened joint military exercises against the climate of dialogue and arrested political figures favouring unification.

South Korea then replied in saying that North Korea denies it is not bound by obligations as others. According to Article 25 of the United Nations Charter "all members carry out UNSC decisions" and, as such, it was regrettable that North Korea repeats irrational force.

28 September
Morning schedule
 - Prime Minister Portia Simpson Miller
 - Prime Minister Navinchandra Ramgoolam
 - Prime Minister Moana Carcasses Kalosil
 - Prime Minister Edi Rama
 - Prime Minister Antoni Martí Petit
 - Prime Minister Dato’ Sri Mohd Najib Bin Tun Haji Abdul Razak
 - Chairman of the Council of Ministers Khil Raj Regmi
 - Prime Minister Dr. Manmohan Singh
 - Prime Minister José Maria Pereira Neves
 - Deputy Prime Minister Leo Dion
 - Foreign Minister Guido Westerwelle
 - Foreign Minister Titus Corlățean
 - Foreign Minister Vladimir Makei
 - Minister of State Rui Machete
 - Foreign Minister Nabil Fahmy
 - Foreign Minister Erlan Abdyldayev
 - Foreign Minister Elmar Maharram oglu Mammadyarov

Afternoon schedule
 - Prime Minister Perry Gladstone Christie
 - Crown Prince Haji Al-muhtadee Billah
 - Vice Prime Minister Thongloun Sisoulith
 - Deputy Prime Minister Eamon Gilmore
 - Deputy Prime Minister Surapong Tovichakchaikul
 - Deputy Prime Minister Manasseh Maelanga
 - Deputy Prime Minister Vete Sakaio
 - Foreign Minister Edward Nalbandyan
 - Foreign Minister Ahmed Teguedi
 - Foreign Minister Aurelia Frick
 - Foreign Minister Abubaker al-Qirbi
 - Foreign Minister K. Shanmugam

Right of reply

30 September
Morning schedule
 - Foreign Minister John Baird
 - Foreign Minister Shaikh Khalid Bin Ahmed Al-Khalifa
 - Foreign Minister Prince Saud Al-Faisal (Scheduled)
 - Deputy Prime Minister Walid Almoualem
 - Deputy Prime Minister Sapardurdu Toyliyev (Scheduled)
 - Foreign Minister Rashid Meredov
 - Foreign Minister Yousef Bin Al-Alawi Bin Abdullah
 - Foreign Minister Gunnar Bragi Sveinsson
 - (Scheduled)
 - Foreign Minister Wilfred Elrington
 - Foreign Minister Saad-Eddine El Othmani
 - Foreign Minister Osman Saleh Mohammed
 - Foreign Minister Samuel Santos López
 - Foreign Minister Alva Romanus Baptiste

Afternoon schedule
 - Foreign Minister János Martonyi
 - Foreign Minister François Lounceny Fall
 - Foreign Minister Albert F. del Rosario
 - Foreign Minister Maxine Pamela Ometa McClean
 - Foreign Minister Wunna Maung Lwin
 - Foreign Minister Lyonpo Rinzin Dorje
 - Foreign Minister Winston G. Lackin
 - Foreign Minister Nickolas Steele

Right of reply
Indonesia replied in strongly rejecting the issue of West Papua made by Vanuatu. They said that the statement reflects an unfortunate lack of understanding on the historic role of the UN and the "principled position of the international community at large" and developments in West Papua, Indonesia. (emphasis added) It was also an "utter refusal to acknowledge" facts of the province and the efforts of the government of Indonesia and local authorities in generating the welfare of the people of the two provinces. Indonesia's representatives at the UN also said that internal political dynamics of Vanuatu have played a role in raising West Papua issues at the UN and was acknowledged by a statement of the prime minister of Vanuatu and published by the Vanuatu Post that read: "West Papua politicised and used various political movements not for the people in West Papua but for political campaigns and propaganda." They reiterated that the statement was not by Indonesian authorities but the then government of Vanuatu. Additionally, Indonesia was not distracted by said inclination and will continue development efforts through special autonomy and will also continue friendly relations with Vanuatu.

Pakistan responded to the statement by the Bangladeshi prime minister in saying that it was deeply dismayed as Pakistan and Bangladesh are brotherly countries and were once citizens of the same country and also continue to have warmth today. They added that the statement by Hasina was misrepresentation of the facts, the premise was wrong and the legal dimension was untenable. unhelpful and counter productive to Bangladesh-Pakistan relations. Yet the people of Pakistan would work to strengthen ties with Bangladesh.

1 October
Morning schedule
 - Acting Foreign Minister Mariyam Shakeela
 - Foreign Minister Phandu T. C. Skelemani
 - Secretary for Relations with States Archbishop Dominique Mamberti
 - Vice Minister for Foreign Affairs Pak Kil Yon
 - Deputy Minister for Foreign Affairs Jose Manuel Trullols
 - Permanent Representative to the UN Kosal Sea
 - Permanent Representative to the UN Vince Henderson
 - Permanent Representative to the UN Kodjo Menan
 - Permanent Representative to the UN Xavier Lasso Mendoza
 - Permanent Representative to the UN Carlos Filomeno Agostinho Das Neves
 - Permanent Representative to the UN Ib Petersen
 - Prime Minister Benjamin Netanyahu

Right of reply

Libya responded to Bolivia statement in saying it had overcome a dictatorship. Though it did not initially attach significance at first to the statement, viewing it as propaganda by one party to another, Morales had asked two specific questions and was entitled to obtain an answer. The questions were: Who had Libyan oil and who owned Libyan oil today. The representative went on to the allege that Libyan oil belonged to Muammar Gaddafi  and his family and distributed to members of international forum to fight imperialism, what he called a terrorist organisation founded by Gaddafi to finance leaders of alleged “terrorist organisations.” He accused Morales of being familiar with it as he was a part of it and a leading member of it. As such he suggested Morales laments Gaddafi’s “dictatorship” as he had lost an excellent source of financing. The delegate also suggested revenue from the oil was distributed by Gaddafi to his assistants and the corrupt around the world to sow chaos and kill innocent people. He claimed to have chosen his words fairly as he said he was not unfair to the tyrant Gaddafi. He also suggested that is he was not believed one could see videos that show Libyan oil was not for funding salaries but to spread the philosophy of Gaddafi’s Green Book. The delegate then added that those were corrupt ideas of a single individual who attempted to destroy state institutions and that was how money was spent in the “reign of this tyrant.” He alleged that today it belongs to the Libyan people to repair what he alleged was destroyed by Gaddafi for decades and to provide basic services to its citizens. He claimed he did not offend Morales as the latter probably knew Libya was one of the richest African states but perhaps did not know or needed to know that over quarter of Libyans were allegedly below the poverty threshold, that Libyan civil servants had amongst the lowest salaries, that the education was the lowest in the region, Libya was corrupt state and that most towns did not have sanitation systems and no public transport—neither within nor between cities. He further claimed that Libya was the only country with no post office or postal code and that most streets did not have street names. He went on to say that Morales was Gaddafi’s friends as revenue from Libyan oil was distributed outside Libya while people were in poverty and basic services were worsening. Morales spoke of the shelling of Libya, but, the delegate claimed,  “no Libya was not shelled or bombed. The international community helped Libya and bombed the troops of the despot who were bombing the town and villages and killing innocent people indiscriminately” and that it was “regrettable [that]  Morales still does not want to acknowledge atrocities committed by his friend Gaddafi's troops against innocent people. If you have a problem with a state or a party don’t use Libya to harm others. The Libyan people know who helped them and who helped their executioner.” As such the “Libyan people would extend their hand to all those who respect their friendship.

In reaction to the comment, Ashe reminded the audience that the right of reply to a head of state had to be in writing. He then continued to call on the other delegations that wanted to use their right of reply.

Iran's Khodadad Seifi responded to allegations against the Iranian nuclear programme saying that Iran has an inalienable right to peaceful nuclear energy and is fully committed to its non-proliferation agreements, that it has always been for peaceful purposes and that Iran continues to fully cooperate with the IAEA. All activities are carried out under the agency’s cameras and resident inspectors regularly visit the sites and measure and seal uranium containers. Some cooperation, it said, is even beyond the legal obligations so as to build more trust and confidence; non-diversion has always been confirmed by the agency. He added that the "agency continues to verify the material at the nuclear facilities by Iran in accordance with the agreement." He further noted that all countries have right to nuclear energy and none to nuclear weapons: “nuclear energy for all and nuclear weapons for no one.” Iran addresses genuine proliferation but rejects conflating peaceful nuclear energy with developing nuclear weapons. In addition to obligations, he said, Islamic teaching is against pursuing nuclear weapons program. Nuclear weapons do not bring security but are the greatest threat to nuclear-haves and have-nots. As there is no reason to accept nuclear weapons but many reasons to abolish them all, nuclear weapons have no place in the defence doctrine of Iran. Yet some countries express concerns over Iranian nuclear weapons and there is a deep mistrust by Iran over the policies and intentions of these countries. Therefore there is a need to build mutual trust that is possible only by resorting to the force of logic not the logic of force. The golden rule is to resort to diplomacy alone. Sustainable solutions are attainable only by peaceful and respectful negotiations. For its part, Iran expresses full readiness to stick to meaningful time-bound negotiations. Iran stands ready to ensure its nuclear program will be exclusively peaceful and remove concerns of other parties and acknowledge the inherent right of Iran to peaceful nuclear energy including a full national fuel cycle. As such sanctions, whether unilateral or multilateral, should be lifted. Mutual respect and equal treatment is essential for a win-win situation. Other parties need to adopt the same approach. Moreover Iran underlines the important contribution other countries can make to the process. Iran takes this opportunity to thank all countries that support sovereign rights to peaceful science and tech and those who have supported, in the past several days, the Iranian programme. However, he cited the as yet extremely inflammatory statement by the “last speaker” with allegations against the peaceful nuclear activities of Iran and it would not dignify such unfound accusations with answers other than categorically rejecting them all. He said that Netanyahu tried to “mislead this august body” about the nuclear programme, but that unlike last year his comments tried to be more royal than a king by setting a standard for Iranian nuclear activities and level of enrichment. As such, he must know that no one can dictate to Iran what to do and not to do. “As a party to the NPT, Iran is fully aware of its rights and is fully committed to its obligations. Indeed the one who is badly in need to be educated about these issues is Israel, the only non-party to the NPT in the Middle East. And to that end Israel no choice but to accede to the NPT without delay and place all its nuclear possessions under IAEA safeguards. [Netanyahu] talked of WMDs in the Middle East without mention that Israel is the only one in the region that possesses all types of WMDss but is [still] not party to any treaty banning them.“ Netanyahu also did not mention the proposed 2012 conference on the establishment of a WMD free zone in the Middle East which was not convened only due to Israeli objections. Similarly to last year, he continued sabre rattling to Iran by abusing the General Debate by threatening a founding member of the body that was intended to prevent breaches of the peace according to the UN charter. Despite this Israel enjoys full freedom and is “proud of all atrocities and over 10 wars waged in 65 years by the Israel regime against all neighbours and others as well. [It] may wish to apply for an international award certifying the ability of Israeli forces in never ending savage attacks against people under occupation, in particular women and innocent children.” Iran warned that Israel should seriously avoid miscalculation about Iran and that Iran’s century’s old policy of non-aggression should not be seen as an inability to defend itself not because of its ability but its principled policy of rejecting the use of force. Iran is proud of being the best in exercising the inherent right to self-defence under Article 51 of the UN charter. Thus Netanyahu better not think of attacking Iran let alone planning for that. In conclusion, to point allegedly made by Iran’s foreign minister at the General Debate: “we have been accused of having a smile attack, a smile attack is better than a military attack” he then concluded that “indeed a smile policy is better than lying.”

Azerbaijan responded to Armenia in saying that as seen from Armenia General Debate statement, Armenia opposes facts that point to its policy of aggression and hatred, outright lies and aggressions. While the Armenian statement responded to statement by OSCE Minsk Group by welcoming it, this mere rhetoric was not enough to reach progress in settlement when the deeds of Armenia are always at variance. Armenia’s Edward Nalbandyan tried to assure the UN community of his government’s adherence to international law; however, in reality, Armenia has grossly violated those and other principles of international law in occupying and control Nagorno-Karabakh and other parts of Azerbaijan. In regard to international norms, to ensure occupied Azerbaijani territory is liberated, Azerbaijan and Armenia established relations in respect of each other. Armenia rejects this understanding in continuing to violate international law. In Nalbandyan’s words, Azerbaijan rejects agreements but this is proven as false and testifies to Armenia’s non-compliance to United Nations Security Council resolutions and undermines the settling of conflict by international law. They then said that Nalbandyan gets carried away and accuses Azerbaijan of carrying out aggression, which is "utter falsehood." Otherwise he would know that four UNSC resolutions or presidential statements did not mention Azerbaijani aggression. There is also contradiction by senior leaders of Armenia who publicly acknowledged at the highest level that the war was started by Armenia and the aim was to implement long nurtured plan of ceasing Azerbaijani territory. This was admitted during the active phase of conflict and Armenia ignored the demands of the UNSC to cease military and hostile attacks. After the ceasefire agreement, mediator countries (three UNSC permanent members) never made reference to the 1993 resolution. To provide absurdity of view, sufficient to include the September 1995 UNSC presidential statement in regard to other resolutions.  In claiming Azerbaijan rejects confidence building measures, Armenia resorts to "usual forgetfulness" that denies the rights of a million Azerbaijani refugees and IDPs to return home. Instead Armenia has removed signs of their historical and cultural roots and opposes direct contacts between Azerbaijan and the communities of Nagorno-Karabakh. Odious ideas of hatred to Azerbaijan and other neighbouring nations  do not contribute to CBMs. Regular attacks by the Armenian armed forces on Azerbaijan civilians and civil objects result in deaths and injuries near the front line. in apparent disregards of international law and respective commitments of arms control regimes, Armenia builds a military presence in the "occupied territories;" while in relations to GDP and the national budget Armenia is the most militarised country in the south Caucasus. Instead of lecturing others on good and bad, Armenia should recall direct involvement of the leadership of Armenia in the conflict that claimed the lives of thousands of Azerbaijani women children and the elderly. Relations with terrorists and war criminals are also seen at the state level and in bestowing state decorations. “Suffice to say unlike Armenian ethnic cleansing of its own territory and of Azerbaijan of all non-Armenians in succeeding to create the monoculture it has, Azerbaijan has maintained diversity. “In conclusion, by challenging UNSC resolutions and OSCE efforts and deliberately denying the right of refugees to return home and the norms of international law Armenia demonstrates who is the danger to international law and peace.

North Korea replied in regard to the nuclear issue in order to draw attention to the “unique security environment” that is threatened and blackmailed by the largest nuclear state. It sought to draw attention to certain points: In 1957 the United States introduced the first nuclear weapon into South Korea  and thus began a presence of nuclear weapon in the land; in the 1970s the number of nuclear weapons reached over 1,000 on the Korean Peninsula alone and thereby made the Korean peninsula the most densely populated nuclear weapons zone; in 2002 the U.S. administration named the D.P.R.K.  as part of the axis of evil and gave a “strong message” to the entire international community that the country is to be eliminated; and the “same administration” listed the D.P.R.K. onto its list of nuclear pre-emptive strikes and that, compounded with all these nuclear weapons, the U.S. and South Korea “every year take part in military drills as mentioned several times in the current session. In March 2013 when the situation was almost on the brink of war and it was the time when the international community realised how dangerous the situation was, [which] means [an] outbreak of nuclear war.” This also occurred with a massive arms build-up of nuclear weapons carried by the aircraft carrier , submarines and the B52 across the ocean. These events were viewed as blackmail and culminated in threatening the survival of the Korean nation as a whole (north and south). As a result of the unique security environment, the D.P.R.K. has no option but to go nuclear to defend its people and not allow “nuclear weapons to drop over the hills of the people. The nuclear deterrent made a great contribution to lasting peace in the Korean Peninsula and the world.” In addition, in accord with “the last speaker,” North Korea made a few more points: Israel has no justification to talk of another country as a full-fledged nuclear state; it is a “cancer in middle east;” it is “disturbing peace and security and shifting blame on all other regional countries;” and Israel and the U.S. are “making noise” about the D.P.RK. but are “mum and quiet and silent over the nuclear weapon of Israel.

Bolivia replied to Libya in saying that the Libyan representative made a set of bold statements that were absurd and unrealistic. “In a fraternal manner,” it reported on the violation of procedure as UN standards mandate replies to heads of state are given in writing. Instead Libya “used the good faith of the president of the General Assembly to proffer unacceptable insults to Morales, Bolivia and its people.” Bolivia insisted that it condemns and will continue to condemn imperialist attacks and draw attention to the true motives of imperial interventions in regard to natural resources and geostrategic interests. It said that “lies will not silence us” and that especially until a fear years ago those that defended Gaddafi, now call him a tyrant. It is “crucial to point out to those who write the scripts in their attack against Morales aim to divert the attention of the General Assembly against the principles of the Charter of the United Nations. [Bolivia would] struggle to ensure no more attacks and no more unilateral attacks occur in the world in violation of international law and loot people.” It also added that the Bolivian people have great respect and admiration for the Libyan people, but in this case, in accordance with the words of the Libyan representative it reserves the right to take any legal action “in our power to make sure there is a public response to the shameless lies by the representative of Libya [against] attempts to divert attention from what Morales did in a dignified manner. It said that Morales also drew attention to the need for those who violate international law and the UN charter and threaten to bomb other states and countries must be subject to judgement for the crimes they commit. The statement added that Bolivia will not be “silenced and allow groundless attacks against the dignity of my people and my country.” Likewise Bolivia endorses the “decision to promote prosecution against crime of war of the U.S. We know who defends the interests of U.S.A., is not a surprise, but at least do so on the basis of truth and not lies [and] invented phrases. The comment in the UNGA will not remain in the record of the assembly. Bolivia’s representative said that his country condemns and will continue to condemn rights against people and sovereignty in international law.”

Armenia responded to Azerbaijan’s reply in saying that firstly it said that it did not intend to take the floor and apologises but it had to comment on the Azerbaijan representatives’ comments based on “more lies in addition to Azerbaijan’s foreign minister (Elmar Mammadyarov),” which was usual statement, “especially when nobody verifies the truth.” It said that what happened in 1988 was self-determination for Nagorno-Karabakh and was a legal constitutional right in response to “massacres and war by Azerbaijan [reacting] to peaceful” demands. “Nothing Azerbaijan tells from any podium is factual; on the contrary it is a constant barrage of lies and anti-Armenian rhetoric. Outrageous lies are told so often so that they eventually got used to them. In fact are repeated lies so often that they believe it is true. That is wishful thinking.” Armenia cited the comments as coming from a country whose president comments Armenia are xenophobic and contrary to “international law in our world. Raising a defence budget is not something to be proud of it as other countries think of development goals and many countries do not have such resources,” yet is said that Azerbaijani President Ilham Aliyev threatens war with Armenia. He also commented on higher defence spending and other related measures. He added that Azerbaijan is a country where someone who killed a foreigner, an Armenian, can get away with it. The murderer in question, he said, was Ramil Safarov who murdered a sleeping person in bed and was a coward but was glorified and declared a national hero. Azerbaijan tactics, he said, regarded the best offence as good defence and that it tries to manipulate the world to save them, but no one can manipulate despite Azerbaijani oil money thus Azerbaijan has no legal or moral right to Nagorno-Karabakh to tell them how or where to live and how independent it ought to be. He accused Azerbaijan’s leadership of speaking in two languages: one with conflict resolution and the other always blaming Armenia. Azerbaijan said they have isolated Armenia and that it is paying a price for it, but UN resolutions call on Azerbaijan to cease hostilities. Despite the 1994 peace pact with the de facto Nagorno-Karabakh, Azerbaijani authorities continue firing on the Line of Contact but should instead start withdrawing snipers which would be CBMs. if Azerbaijan wished to return refugees and IDPs, it should follow the OSCE-Minsk Group to yield pay offs in a right away.

Libya used its second right of reply to respond to Bolivia’s statement.  This time the delegate said that in respect of President John William Ashe he would only add that he has “never lied in life and will not lie in this life. Those who want to see documents are welcome to see it.”

Azerbaijan took the floor again and said that it was unfortunate that the Armenian delegation used this platform to make groundless propagandist statements. In reality, the General Assembly “witnessed another unsuccessful attempt to mislead the international community. It was lies, distortions and misrepresentation that we categorically reject. This demonstrates how this member state is not constructive and introduces nothing knew but abused the right to speak from the high rostrum of the UN." As such he said that what was heard were “irrelevant and comments that did not respond to arguments. Comments by Armenia are also illustrative of that member state’s attempts to create wrong situations and to deflect the international community from the main problems cause by its aggression against Azerbaijan. [It was also an] open challenge to the conflict settlement process. Earlier officials of this country realised the lack of any prospect of the unconstructive and dangerous political agenda and that [it would be better] the sooner our people will benefit from cooperation.”

Bolivia again regretted this “forum is being used in violation of our norms to attack the dignity not just of a president but also a people and a member state of the UN. We regret that attempts being made to draw away from the central theme made by the courageous statement by our president, Bolivia supported every word not only spoken by Morales by even what I said in my post as permanent representative. [As such] Bolivia will not play the game of trying to draw attention away from the core issue: appropriation of natural resource wars, plundering and geostrategic interests of the U.S.A. [It is up to] each to decide if we will follow the written scripts... the lies and manipulations by the representative of Libya are totally rejected by Bolivia and Bolivia will take necessary steps which we have the right to take.”

Armenia responded again in saying that the”only gauge to measure Azerbaijan’s words is their participation of OSCE summits and the statements of the president of the co-chair countries. [As such] Armenia was in line with these documents [and] Armenia and the international community speak in one language on Nagorno-Karabakh. It is time for Azerbaijan to listen to the UN.” He also sought appealed to the politics of memory and remind Azerbaijan: in 1988 Nagorno-Karabakh peacefully asked for independence and was then attacked by Azerbaijan; in 1992 after self-defence measures it declared independence, it is “not difficult to remember basic textbook facts” but Azerbaijan retells the story in a manner they would like to see themselves and the statements of Azerbaijan indicate it is a “racist and xenophobic state;” and that on 18 September 2013, Aliyev said: the "national flag of Azerbaijan must be raised in Shusha and Hankandi and Azerbaijanis should live on all historic lands of Erevan...the time will come when we Azeris will live there I’m sure of that time is passing we simply want it to happen soon." Armenia reminded the audience that the geographic names are distorted Azerbaijani versions of Armenian names and that “tomorrow Azerbaijan will give a brief on the programme for the month, the month of its presidency [of the UNSC], and will speak of peace. No one in their right mind will believe that. Azerbaijan can’t advocate for war on [its] neighbour and talk of peace. [This] sounds like a wolf in sheep’s clothing. Don’t buy the argument and no one should.”

South Korea responded to the D.P.R. K. to clarify that the joint military exercise with the U.S. is a legitimate defensive measure against D.P.R. K. aggression and what it called “daily threats by North Korea” and, as such, was a purely defensive response. The exercise, it said, contributed to deterrence for war for several decades on the Korean Peninsula. Under the relevant UNSC resolution of 19 September2005 and the joint statement, North Korea has the obligation to dismantle all its nuclear weapons and enrichment programmes. The more recent UNSC resolution 2094 on 7 March 2013 also clarified this.

North Korea responded immediately to the South Korean statement saying that it made “very absurd remarks and [that it was] reject[ed] as totally as misleading. [As such,]193 UN member states were being told a distorted truth.” He specifically cites the South Korean reference to military actions that was claimed to be a routine exercise and defensive. [However,] if [one] look[s] at the nature [one] can easily understand it is offensive and aggressive and targeted at D.P.R.K. Last month 500,000 troops and reserve forces were mobilised, [along with] B52 bombers to aircraft carriers and B52s alone, [as] we all know, [have] the capability. It contains tomahawk missiles, nuclear weapon tipped and nuclear weapon gravity bombs to be dropped. [These] came to South Korea and attended drill and dropping in real conditions on the doorstep of the D.P R.K., threatening the peace and security of the Korean peninsula and the region as a whole and undermining peace and development which is the major trend of the Asia-Pacific region.” It added that as this was “against the D.P.R.K. It makes clear that the D.P.R.K. has been selected by the U.S.A. and its manipulation is purely out of [an] hostile policy to the D.P.R.K. with THE abusive of power that the permanent member holds. Thus the D.P.R.K. never recognises the resolution[s]. According to the mandate of the UNSC, the joint South Korean-U.S.A. drill should be raised as the greatest and gravest threat to the peace and security of the region.

South Korea immediately and again took to the floor to say that North Korea once again has “habit of blaming others for its habits and provocation [and that] tensions in the region [were a result] by missile launches and threats.” It also stressed that not only the UNSC but other member states <!—18??--> condemned North Koreas third nuclear test and urged it to abide by the relevant UN resolutions. It further noted on North Korea saying that questioning credibility of the UNSC in that the UNSC is the prime organ in the maintenance of peace and that all resolutions by the UNSC were unanimously adopted.

Iran returned on a point of order to inform the General Assembly that the representative had misquoted his foreign minister. What was actually said was a "smile attack is better than a lie attack" and that he should have memorised it. He wished to reiterate that a "smile attack is better than a lie attack."

Closing remarks
President John William Ashe closed the General Debate for the year in summation of the comments. He said the comments made would guide the session and recalled his theme of the General Debate and outlining priority areas for deliberations by member states in the form of high level events or thematic debates. He added that virtually all delegations that commented on the theme, commended and pledged full support for it. He regards this as a premise on what is to come over the next year and “trust[s] we all work creatively and capably in the session.” He also sought to build on the Rio +20 and begin work on finding a universal development agenda that includes food security, health care (particularly maternal care) and the fight against H.I.V./A.I.D.S. He also reminded the audience that some delegations had said that democracy, human rights and peace and security must be a part of the sustainable development agenda; and that some also spoke of empower of women, youth, indigenous and disabled. He also talked of the emphasis on the role of partnerships (which will be focus of one thematic debate) and reminded the delegates gathered that while South-South cooperation is important in development, it complements north-south cooperation not replacement. He also called on the participation of non-state actors and a need for funding innovation and technology transfer. He further reminded the delegations of the specific needs and vulnerabilities of SIDS are an important consideration in the Post-2015 Development Agenda.

Statements at the General Debate, he noted, included many condemnations of the use of chemical weapons in Syria coupled with calls for the perpetrators to be held accountable and welcomes Syria’s adherence to the OPCW. Many states also welcomed the unanimous adoption of United Nations Security Council Resolution 2118 on Syria and for UNSC to uphold its charter on action, the desire for a negotiated solution in the Geneva II Conference on Syria. On the issue of Palestine, there were repeated call for a two state solution and, on those lines, there was a welcoming of the resumption of direct negotiations. He also heard praise for progress in Mali and the Democratic Republic of Congo, though there was concern for Guinea-Bissau, Central African Republic, Sudan and the Sahel. On Somalia, he heard words of encouragement and caution. There were also calls for the international community to take action against terrorism in all its forms and a strong condemnation of terrorist incidents in Kenya, Pakistan, and Iraq; though he said that “sadly…add Nigeria.” He also called for a role for women and to eliminate sexual violence in conflict and the role of child soldiers. He further commented on the transition after the Arab Spring and on cyber security requiring a bigger UN role. He also noted there was some reservations on the International Criminal Court with bias to particular geographic regions, concerns about the use of WMDs and risks of proliferation, calls for the creation of nuclear-weapon-free zones and that the use of small arms revived a negative impact on peace and security and that, as such, the ATT was welcomed with calls for its prompt entry into force. Other called included the need to reform the primary organs of the UN with more balance to be fair and accountable, in particular the UNSC and how the use of the veto has had a paralysing effect; in this regard the UNGA should have a bigger role and have better coordination. This then required member states to move with purposeful direction on required reforms and revitalisation.

The General Debate, he concluded, provides “useful measure of stock taking within the mandate of the organisation and was the only place for the 193 member states to have their voices heard [amongst] what effects our peoples’ concerns. The organisation is often accused of being a talk shop, perhaps so, but the General Debate serves a purpose to mark where we as a global community and mark guidelines for direction. [It is a] useful point for peer review and general accountability. despite negative, faith in the value of the organisation as world forum is high. With guidance this week, we must find common ground to move forward on actions. In the real world where we live, such compromise is good for a post-2015 framework. I look forward to working with you. In conclude by thanking the secretary general and the department of conference management.”

Notes

References

68
2013 in international relations
2013 in New York City
September 2013 events
October 2013 events